Succoth may mean:

 The Jewish festival of Sukkot. 
 One of the stations (Sukkot (place)) during the Israelite exodus from Egypt (Exodus 12:37), thought to be El Arish.
 Succoth, Argyll and Bute, a village in Argyll and Bute, Scotland

Succoth-benoth, Babylonian deity
 The biblical site of Succoth in Transjordan (now Deir Alla)